Thérèse-Marthe-Françoise Dupré (1877 – 1920) was a French realist painter.

Dupré was born in Paris and learned to paint from her father Jules Dupré. She is known for paintings depicting women's work in the manner of her father and her uncle Georges Paul François Laurent Laugée. She married Edmond Cotard in 1889. Their son Henri Edmond Cotard (b.1899) also became a painter. She became a member of the Salon des Artistes Français in 1907. Her painting La Lessive was on show at the Paris Salon in 1910.

References

1877 births
1920 deaths
Painters from Paris
19th-century French painters
French women painters
19th-century French women artists